is a former Japanese football player. He is the current assistant manager of J1 League club Yokohama FC.

Playing career
Hayakawa was born in Shizuoka on July 11, 1977. After graduating from Juntendo University, he joined J2 League club Urawa Red Diamonds in 2000. Although the club was promoted to J1 League from 2001, he could hardly play in the match in 3 seasons until 2002. In 2003, he moved to J2 club Yokohama FC. He played many matches as right side back and center back for a long time. In 2006, he played as center back and the club won the champions and was promoted to J1 from 2007. Although he played many matches in 2007, the club was relegated to J2 in a year and his opportunity to play decreased in 2008. In August 2008, he moved to the J1 club JEF United Chiba on loan. However he could not play many matches. In 2009, he returned to Yokohama FC. Although he played many matches as a regular player in 2009, his opportunity to play decreased in 2010 and he retired at the end of the 2010 season.

Club statistics

References

External links

1977 births
Living people
Juntendo University alumni
Association football people from Shizuoka Prefecture
Japanese footballers
J1 League players
J2 League players
Urawa Red Diamonds players
Yokohama FC players
JEF United Chiba players
Association football defenders
J1 League managers
Yokohama FC managers